Emilio Ortíz was an Argentine track and field athlete who competed in the hammer throw. His greatest achievement was a gold medal at the inaugural 1951 Pan American Games, held on home turf in Buenos Aires. He was a surprise winner of that event, over more favoured opposition. Ortíz remained the only South American to win that hammer title until he was matched by his fellow countryman Juan Ignacio Cerra in 2003.

References

Possibly living people
20th-century births
Argentine male hammer throwers
Pan American Games gold medalists for Argentina
Pan American Games medalists in athletics (track and field)
Athletes (track and field) at the 1951 Pan American Games
Medalists at the 1951 Pan American Games